Supermalt is a non-alcoholic, caffeine-free malt drink that was originally developed for the Nigerian Army in 1972. It has a high content of B vitamins, minerals and nutrients, and has a balance of carbohydrates that supposedly allow instant absorption. It is dark brown in colour and has a sweet flavour. Supermalt may be purchased in 330ml glass bottles, or cans, sold individually or in their respective six-packs. Supermalt is now produced by Royal Unibrew A/S in Denmark. It is most popular among the African and African-Caribbean community.

Production
Non-alcoholic malt drinks can be made by either the traditional brewing method, where barley is steeped into malt and then brewed into a creamy, rich consistency, or made like a soft drink by using malt extract. Supermalt uses traditional brewing skills for all its non-alcoholic batches.

The main difference between non-alcoholic malt drinks and non-alcoholic beers is that malt drinks are usually sweet and always dark in color. The sweet notes are a combination of naturally occurring glucose, fructose, saccharose, maltose and maltotriose.

Various products of Supermalt are sold worldwide in more than 70 countries, and are mostly popular among the African and African-Caribbean communities in the UK. The primary consumer target group for malt drinks is the African-Caribbean population, which represents more than 1 million people in the UK, London being the largest single European market for malt drinks.

Nutritional Value
Supermalt is made solely from raw materials of vegetable origin, except for the B-vitamins, which are synthetic nature-identical ingredients. No animal products are used so Supermalt is suitable for vegetarians and vegans.

Supermalt's nutritional values (compared to milk, orange juice, cola and beer):

*Variation may occur in each category.

Product variants
Powermalt – rich in antioxidants and has higher malt content as it is brewed with four different types of barley malts. Specially developed for more energy or to enhance performance.
Supermalt Plus – based on the original Supermalt, but enriched with ginseng and aloe vera.
Supermalt Fusion – the fruity, lighter alternative to the original Supermalt, with either apple, mango or pineapple.
Supermalt Less Sugar - launched 2018 containing 30% less sugar.
Vitamalt – a less-specialised variation of the original Supermalt.

Ingredients                                                                                                                                                                                                                                 
Water, barley malt (7,6% of the total liquid), barley, sugar, colour (E150c), carbon dioxide, liquorice, vitamins (Niacin (B3), Thiamin (B1), Pantothenic acid (B5), Riboflavin (B2), Vitamin (B6)).

References

Energy drinks
Non-alcoholic drinks
Soft drinks
Malt-based drinks
Barley-based drinks